The 2003–04 season was the 105th season in RC Lens's history. The club participated in the Ligue 1, the Coupe de France, Coupe de la Ligue and UEFA Cup. The season began on 2 August 2003 and concluded on 23 May 2004.

Competitions

Overall record

Ligue 1

League table

Results summary

Results by round

Matches 

Source:

Coupe de France

Coupe de la Ligue

UEFA Cup

Qualifying round

First round

Second round

Statistics

Appearances and goals

|-
! colspan="14" style="background:#dcdcdc; text-align:center"| Goalkeepers

|-
! colspan="14" style="background:#dcdcdc; text-align:center"| Defenders

|-
! colspan="14" style="background:#dcdcdc; text-align:center"| Midfielders

|-
! colspan="14" style="background:#dcdcdc; text-align:center"| Forwards

|-

References

RC Lens seasons
French football clubs 2003–04 season